Joseph Bell FRCSE (2 December 1837 – 4 October 1911) was a Scottish surgeon and lecturer at the medical school of the University of Edinburgh in the 19th century. He is best known as an inspiration for the literary character, Sherlock Holmes.

Early life
Bell was the son of Cecilia Barbara Craigie (1813–1882) and Benjamin Bell (1810–1883), and a great-grandson of Benjamin Bell, considered to be the first Scottish scientific surgeon. Bell studied medicine at the University of Edinburgh Medical School and received an MD in 1859 presenting the thesis "Epithelial cancer: its pathology and treatment". During his time as a student, he was a member of the Royal Medical Society and delivered a dissertation which is still in possession of the society today.

Career
In his instruction, Joseph Bell emphasized the importance of close observation in making a diagnosis. To illustrate this, he would often pick a stranger, and by observing him, deduce his occupation and recent activities. These skills caused him to be considered a pioneer in forensic science, (forensic pathology in particular) at a time when science was not yet widely used in criminal investigation.
He served as personal surgeon to Queen Victoria whenever she visited Scotland. He also published several medical textbooks. Bell was a Fellow of the Royal College of Surgeons of Edinburgh (RCSEd), a justice of the peace, and a deputy lieutenant. In 1876 he was elected a member of the Aesculapian Club. He was elected president of the RCSEd in 1887.

Bell wrote the book Manual of the Operations of Surgery, published in 1866.

Personal life
In 1883, Bell bought 2 Melville Crescent, a large townhouse, previously the home of the engineer John Miller of Leithen.

Joseph Bell died on 4 October 1911. He was buried at the Dean Cemetery in Edinburgh alongside his wife Edith Katherine Erskine Murray (1840–1874) and their son Benjamin, and next to his parents' and brother's plots. The grave is mid-way along the north wall of the northern section to the original cemetery.

Inspiration of Sherlock Holmes
Arthur Conan Doyle met Bell in 1877, and served as his clerk at the Edinburgh Royal Infirmary. Doyle later went on to write a series of popular stories featuring the fictional character Sherlock Holmes, who Doyle stated was loosely based on Bell and his observant ways. Bell was aware of this inspiration. According to Irving Wallace (in an essay originally in his book The Fabulous Originals but later republished and updated in his collection The Sunday Gentleman), Bell was involved in several police investigations, mostly in Scotland, such as the Ardlamont mystery of 1893, usually with forensic expert Professor Henry Littlejohn. Bell also gave his analysis of the Ripper murders to Scotland Yard.

Dramatization
The BBC television series Murder Rooms: The Dark Beginnings of Sherlock Holmes was a fictionalized account of Doyle's time as Bell's clerk. The series may have exaggerated Bell's criminal investigations as well as the degree to which Holmes was based on Bell (played by Ian Richardson), and it positioned Doyle in the role of a Dr. Watson to Bell's Holmes. The original one-off production, which led to the later series, was released on DVD and VHS in the US in 2003, titled Dr. Bell and Mr. Doyle – The Dark Beginnings of Sherlock Holmes.

In 2006, Stone Publishing House published a book, written by historian Dr. Robert Hume, aimed at schoolchildren titled Dr. Joseph Bell – the Original Sherlock Holmes.

In the Doctor Who episode "Tooth and Claw" in 2006, the time travelling adventurer known as the Doctor identifies himself as an ex-student of Bell to Queen Victoria.

The comic book Les dossiers du Professeur Bell by Joann Sfar is about the (fictional) supernatural adventures of Dr. Bell.

In episode 11, Season 5, of the Fox TV show House M.D., Wilson presents House with Joseph Bell's Manual Of the Operations of Surgery as a Christmas gift. The character of House is based on Holmes, who, as noted, was based in turn on Bell. When House's staff begin to wonder what dark meaning to put to House throwing away the expensive Christmas gift of the book, an amused Wilson begins making up a story about House having a closeted infatuation with a patient named Irene Adler whom he will always consider to be "the one who got away".

The novel Mr. Doyle & Dr. Bell (1997) by Howard Engel is a fictionalized account of Joseph Bell and his influence on Conan Doyle.

Memorial
A bronze plaque memorial was erected to Joseph Bell at 2 Melville Crescent in Edinburgh, his home for his final decades, on 8 October 2011, the centenary of his death. The plaque explains Bell's connection to Conan Doyle and Sherlock Holmes, and was organized and funded by the Japan Sherlock Holmes Club. The building is now the Japanese Consulate in Edinburgh.

The unveiling ceremony was attended by the several people involved in the erection of the plaque (principally Takeshi Shimizu) and representatives of various Sherlock Holmes clubs and societies. All present gave a short speech on their connections to either Holmes or the project, and a speech from Professor Owen Dudley Edwards. The plaque was created and cast by Powderhall Bronze of Edinburgh.

Grave

References

External links

Joseph Bell: An Appreciation by An Old Friend 1913. (Jessie M. E. Saxby)
The Arthur Conan Doyle Encyclopedia
Sherlock Holmes and Dr. Joseph Bell
Joseph Bell Centre for Forensic Statistics and Legal Reasoning

A manual of the operations of surgery By Joseph Bell at Internet Archive
Google Map showing location of Bell's grave

1837 births
1911 deaths
Medical doctors from Edinburgh
Alumni of the University of Edinburgh
Academics of the University of Edinburgh
Arthur Conan Doyle
Deputy Lieutenants of Edinburgh
British forensic scientists
Scottish pathologists
Fellows of the Royal College of Surgeons of Edinburgh
Presidents of the Royal College of Surgeons of Edinburgh
Burials at the Dean Cemetery
Sherlock Holmes